Casey M. Weinstein (born August 27, 1982) is an American veteran, businessman, and politician who is the State Representative for the 34th district of the Ohio House of Representatives. The district consists of portions of Summit County. Weinstein previously served as a member of the Hudson City Council.

Ohio House of Representatives

Election
After an unsuccessful campaign in 2016, Weinstein was elected in the general election on November 6, 2018, winning 51 percent of the vote over 49 percent of Republican candidate Mike Rasor. Weinstein's victory flipped the seat from Republican control to Democratic control. Weinstein slightly increased his margin of victory while successfully running for reelection in 2020.

Committees
Weinstein serves on the following committees: Agriculture and Rural Development, Armed Services and Veterans Affairs, and Energy and Natural Resources.

Election history

References

Weinstein, Casey
Living people
21st-century American politicians
1982 births
United States Air Force Academy alumni
Ohio State University Fisher College of Business alumni